Michael Timothy Brosnan (5 December 1907 – 20 July 1966) was a publican and member of the Queensland Legislative Assembly.

Biography
Brosnan was born in the outback Queensland town of Winton to parents Michael Brosnan and his wife Edith Elizabeth (née Kettle). He worked for the Tramway Department of the Brisbane City Council as an electrical fitter and mechanic from 1928 until 1944. He then became an organiser for the Electrical Trades Union from 1944 to 1950 and then was licensee at a series of hotels in Brisbane, Townsville, South Australia, and Tewantin.

On 18 January 1933 he married Merle Isabel Adeline Cutlack (died 1990) and together had one son. Brosnan died at Stafford in Brisbane in July 1966 and was buried in the Toowong Cemetery.

Public career
Brosnan was the Labor member for the Queensland state seat of Fortitude Valley from 1950 until 1957. In the 1957 split of the Labor Party in Queensland, he sided with Premier Vince Gair and most of his cabinet in forming the Queensland Labor Party. Brosnan lost his seat to the Liberal Candidate, Bob Windsor at the election held later that year.

While a member of the Labor, he held the following party positions:
 Member, ALP Industrial Groups Executive
 Member, Queensland ALP Executive Committee, 1953 - 1956
 Delegate, Queensland Central Executive, 1953 - 1956
 Queensland delegate to the federal ALP conference, 1956

He was also the sole Australian delegate at the General Conference of the Commonwealth Parliamentary Association in Ottawa, Canada in 1952.

References

Members of the Queensland Legislative Assembly
1907 births
1966 deaths
Burials at Toowong Cemetery
Australian Labor Party members of the Parliament of Queensland
Queensland Labor Party members of the Parliament of Queensland
20th-century Australian politicians